Daniel Felipe Revelez Pereira (born 30 September 1959) is a Uruguayan former footballer who played as a defender.

Club career
Born in Rocha, Revelez made his Uruguayan Primera División debut with C.A. Bella Vista. His performances with Bella Vista led to a move abroad to play for Colombian side Deportivo Cali. Two seasons later, he transferred to Argentina to play for Chacarita Juniors. He would return to Uruguay with Danubio F.C. and then Bella Vista. At age 28, Revelez joined Club Nacional de Football where he would win the Copa Libertadores and Intercontinental Cup in 1988.

International career
Revelez made 21 appearances for the senior Uruguay national football team from 1980 to 1991, and was a member of the squad for the 1990 FIFA World Cup finals. He also played in the 1989 and 1991 Copa América.

Revelez also played at the 1979 FIFA World Youth Championship in Japan.
He played in Marcelo Salas' farewell match.

References

 

1959 births
Living people
Uruguayan footballers
Uruguayan expatriate footballers
Uruguay under-20 international footballers
Uruguay international footballers
1990 FIFA World Cup players
1989 Copa América players
1991 Copa América players
Uruguayan Primera División players
Categoría Primera A players
C.A. Bella Vista players
Danubio F.C. players
Club Nacional de Football players
Deportivo Cali footballers
Chacarita Juniors footballers
Expatriate footballers in Argentina
Expatriate footballers in Colombia
Association football defenders